Ryan Lesser is an American video game and board game designer, musician and graphic artist living in Providence, Rhode Island. A graduate of Rhode Island School of Design, he is best known for his design and art direction on influential video games Guitar Hero, Guitar Hero II, Rock Band and The Beatles: Rock Band.

Ryan Lesser is the Art Director for video game developer Otherside Entertainment, faculty at Rhode Island School of Design and Founder of Wild Power Games. From 1999–2018, Ryan served as Creative Lead and Art Director at Harmonix. He is a member of the heavy metal band Megasus. In the early to mid 1990s, Lesser worked with Shepard Fairey on the street art phenomena "Andre the Giant has a Posse" and "OBEY", and edited Helen Stickler's video documentary André the Giant Has a Posse and co-created Attention Deficit Disorder with Shepard Fairey.

In 2014, Ryan led a successful Kickstarter campaign for the Harmonix video game Amplitude to ship on PlayStation 4 and PlayStation 3.

Games

Patents
Ryan is listed as an Inventor on the following patents:

Notes and references

External links

Harmonix Website
Megasus FaceBook Page

American contemporary artists
Video game artists
Rhode Island School of Design alumni
American graphic designers
Living people
Year of birth missing (living people)